SMK Mahsuri or officially, Sekolah Menengah Kebangsaan Mahsuri, is a public secondary school located at the heart of Kuah, Langkawi, Kedah, Malaysia. The majority of the students in this school are enrolled in 10 semesters (5 school years) of preparatory courses before taking the national exam known as the Malaysian Certificate of Education. whereas some students who choose to pursue Sixth Form usually undergo one and a half more years of schooling. Science courses including Biology, Chemistry and Physics are usually not offered here. 

The school has always been widely recognized as the most culturally diverse school within the local community. The school has successfully proven its excellence in nurturing past and future generations of students on the island of Langkawi.  The school is also proud of its motto: "Berusaha, Berjaya", or "Strive, Succeed" in English.
which clearly symbolizes its dedication to providing quality education and equal opportunities for local residents. SMK Mahsuri is the second oldest secondary school in Langkawi after SMK Tunku Putra. It was established in 1964 under the name "Lanjutan Kampong School" and later known as "Kuah Secondary School". In 1966, the school moved to Jalan Ayer Hangat, now renamed "Mahsuri Secondary School". 

In April 1966, a dormitory was built using the school's B block. In 1982, two hostel blocks, a canteen and a surau were built. Now the school has a dormitory consisting of 4 blocks (2 blocks for males and 2 blocks for females). The school was opened by the Minister of Education, Mr. Mohamed Khir Johari on November 12, 1966. The name of the school, SMK Mahsuri was derived from a young girl's name, Mahsuri who was executed after being accused of adultery according to local mythology.  It is generally believed that the girl was actually innocent and thus the school adopted her name as a tribute to the tragic death of Mahsuri who was at the time a victim of slander and herd mentality. 

On August 1, 1997, the school was known as SMK Mahsuri. Now, SMK Mahsuri consists of a classroom block, a three-floor block made up of 9 science laboratories, a computer laboratory, a large hall and a dormitory.

Notable alumni 
Notable alumni from SMK Mahsuri include:
 Aziz Desa – Former host, reporter & announcer of Langkawi.FM, TV3, ASTRO OASIS, RTM, and TV9.
 Aidid Marcello – TV3 host.
 Amylea Azizan – Placed third in reality program Akademi Fantasia Season 3.
 Raja Yasmin – Host.
 Kartina Aziz - Actor and Active.

References

External links 
 

Schools in Kedah
Secondary schools in Malaysia